Tommi Pikkarainen (born 6 December 1969) is a Finnish football manager and former player.

References

External links

1969 births
Living people
Finnish footballers
Association football defenders
Veikkausliiga players
Finnish football managers
Salon Palloilijat managers
FC Jazz players
Husqvarna FF players
TPS Turku football managers
Finnish expatriate footballers
Finnish expatriate football managers
Finnish expatriate sportspeople in Sweden
Expatriate footballers in Sweden
Finnish expatriate sportspeople in Lithuania
Expatriate football managers in Lithuania
People from Kokkola
Sportspeople from Central Ostrobothnia